Stanwell Corporation is a Queensland government-owned corporation. It is the state's largest electricity generator and Australia’s third-largest greenhouse gas emitter.

Stanwell own and operate a portfolio of electricity generation assets in Queensland including two of the youngest and most efficient coal-fired power stations in Australia – Stanwell Power Station in Rockhampton and Tarong North Power Station in the South Burnett.

The business employs approximately 800 people across its various sites in Queensland.  The two ministers responsible for Stanwell are the Treasurer of Queensland and Energy Minister.

Major assets
Major assets owned and operated by Stanwell include 

 Stanwell Power Station
 Tarong Power Station
 Tarong North Power Station
 Meandu Mine
 Mica Creek Power Station
 Mackay Gas Turbine
 Wivenhoe Small Hydro

On 31 October 2019, ownership of Stanwell's low and no emission power stations was transferred to CleanCo Queensland. This includes the gas-fired Swanbank E Power Station and the three Far North Queensland hydro facilities (Kareeya, Barron Gorge and Koombooloomba). Windy Hill Wind Farm in Queensland and Toora Wind Farm in Victoria were owned by Stanwell but were sold to Transfield Services in 2007. The company also subsequently sold Emu Downs Wind Farm in Western Australia.

Following a review by the Treasurer of Queensland of the state's electricity sector in 2010, Tarong Energy became a wholly owned subsidiary of Stanwell Corporation on 1 July 2011.

History
In 2016, The Department of Environment and Heritage Protection began an investigation into the tailings disposal company used by Stanwell.

Management
In 2016, management at Stanwell was criticised for receiving bonuses when a company they charged with tailings disposal for their assets had not paid its debts.

In 2021, the Chairman of the board of Directors was Paul Binstead. Richard van Breda resigned from the CEO position in 2021.

References

External links
Stanwell Corporation

Government-owned companies of Queensland
Electric power companies of Australia
Energy in Queensland